Nordine Talhi (born 22 July 1986) is a French association footballer of Algerian descent.

He currently is contracted to Singapore NFL Division 2 side Admiralty FC and plays as a midfielder for the Wolves.

Talhi previously started out as a defender with former S.League club Etoile FC when he signed for the Stars in the 2010 S.League season. He made the switch to Admiralty following Etoile's decision to pull out from the 2012 S.League to concentrate on youth development.

Career

Etoile Football Club
Signed for the 2010 S.League season, Talhi made 15 appearances for the Clementi Stars in his first season.

Despite the majority of the team being released for the 2011 S.League season, Talhi was retained by new manager Guglielmo Arena. He scored his first goal for the club in the 3-0 victory over Tanjong Pagar on 22 March 2011.

Talhi played mostly as a defender for Etoile FC, appearing 41 times and scoring 2 goals for the Stars. He was also the vice captain of Etoile for the 2011 S.League season behind team captain and goalkeeper Antonin Trilles.

Admiralty Football Club
In 2012, Admiralty FC team manager R. Vengadasalam announced that he had signed Talhi for the NFL Division 2 2012 season.

Talhi is deployed mostly as a midfielder by the Wolves and has scored 9 goals in 11 appearances so far in the 2012 season.

Honours
S.League
 2010: Champions

Singapore League Cup
 2010: Champions

NFL Division 2
 2012 NFL Division 2: Champions

References

External links
 

Living people
1991 births
French footballers
Expatriate footballers in Singapore
Footballers from Lyon
Association football midfielders
Étoile FC players